Rose Hill Farm, also known as the James-Marshall-Snyder Farm, is a double-pile, two story brick farmhouse with Greek Revival features near Shepherdstown, West Virginia.  A log house on the property was built circa 1795, while the brick house was built around 1835.  It is believed that the log house was built by Samuel Davenport, who leased the land from the Stephen family.  In 1821 the property was sold to Thomas James.

References

Houses on the National Register of Historic Places in West Virginia
Houses in Jefferson County, West Virginia
Greek Revival houses in West Virginia
Farms on the National Register of Historic Places in West Virginia
National Register of Historic Places in Jefferson County, West Virginia
Houses completed in 1795
Houses completed in 1835
Log buildings and structures on the National Register of Historic Places in West Virginia